Survival of motor neuron 1 (SMN1), also known as component of gems 1 or GEMIN1, is a gene that encodes the SMN protein in humans.

Gene 

SMN1 is the telomeric copy of the gene encoding the SMN protein; the centromeric copy is termed SMN2. SMN1 and SMN2 are part of a 500 kbp inverted duplication on chromosome 5q13. This duplicated region contains at least four genes and repetitive elements which make it prone to rearrangements and deletions. The repetitiveness and complexity of the sequence have also caused difficulty in determining the organization of this genomic region. SMN1 and SMN2 are nearly identical and encode the same protein. The critical sequence difference between the two is a single nucleotide in exon 7 which is thought to be an exon splice enhancer. It is thought that gene conversion events may involve the two genes, leading to varying copy numbers of each gene.

Clinical significance 

Mutations in SMN1 are associated with spinal muscular atrophy. Mutations in SMN2 alone do not lead to disease, although mutations in both SMN1 and SMN2 result in embryonic death.

References

Further reading

External links 
 

Spinal muscular atrophy